Discography for the cellist Yo-Yo Ma.

Discography

1978:
Finzi: Concerto for Cello and Orchestra Op. 40 (reissued 2007)

1979:
Robert White Sings Beethoven

1980:
Saint-Saëns: Carnival of the Animals | Variations on a Theme of Beethoven, OP. 35 | Polonaise, OP. 77
Saint-Saëns and Lalo: Cello Concertos
Beethoven: Triple Concerto in C Major, Op.56

1981:
Haydn: Cello Concertos
Beethoven: Complete Sonatas for Cello and Piano, Vol. 1 (with Emanuel Ax)

1982:
Kreisler, Paganini

1983:
Bach: Sonatas for Viola da Gamba and Harpsichord
Bach: The Six Unaccompanied Cello Suites
Shostakovich and Kabalevsky: Cello Concertos
Beethoven: Cello Sonatas, Op.5, Nos.1 & 2
Kreisler, Paganini: Works

1984:
Bolling: Suite for Cello and Jazz Piano Trio
Beethoven: Complete Sonatas for Cello and Piano, Vol. 2 (with Emanuel Ax)
Schubert: String Quintet
Haydn: Three Favorite Concertos -- Cello, Violin and Trumpet Concertos
Beethoven Sonatas, Volume 2, No. 3, Op. 69; No. 5 Op. 102, No. 2

1985:
Japanese Melodies
Elgar, Walton: Cello Concertos
Mozart: Divertimento, K.563
Brahms: Sonatas for Cello and Piano (with Emanuel Ax)
Schubert: Quintet in C Major

1986:
Strauss: Don Quixote; Schoenberg: Concerto
Beethoven: Complete Sonatas for Cello and Piano, Vol. 3 (with Emanuel Ax)
Dvořák: Cello Concerto
Beethoven: Cello Sonata No.4; Variations

1987:
Boccherini: Concerto | J.C. Bach: Sinfonia Concertante and Grand Overture
Mozart: Adagio and Fugue in C Minor | Schubert: String Quartet No.15
Beethoven: Complete Cello Sonatas

1988:
Schumann: Cello Concerto | Fantasiestucke, Op. 73 | Adagio and Allegro, Op. 70 | Funf Stucke im Volkston, Op. 102 (with Emanuel Ax)
Dvořák: Piano Trios (with Emanuel Ax and Young Uck Kim)
Brahms: Double Concerto; Piano Quartet (tracks 1-3, with the Chicago Symphony Orchestra with Claudio Abbado, conductor; tracks 4-7, with Emanuel Ax, Isaac Stern, and Jaime Laredo)
Shostakovich: Piano Trio | Cello Sonata (with Emanuel Ax)

1989:
Barber: Cello Concerto | Britten: Symphony for Cello & Orchestra
Strauss and Britten: Cello Sonatas (with Emanuel Ax)
Shostakovich: Quartet No.15 | Gubaidulina: Rejoice!
Anything Goes: Stephane Grappelli & Yo-Yo Ma Play (Mostly) Cole Porter
Great Cello Concertos: Dvořák, Elgar, Haydn, Saint-Saëns, Schumann
The Japanese Album
Portrait of Yo-Yo Ma
Shostakovich: Symphony No.5; Cello Concerto

1990:
Mozart: Serenade No. 10 | Sonata for Bassoon and Cello
Brahms: The Piano Quartets (with Emanuel Ax, Isaac Stern, and Jaime Laredo)
 2 CDs:  Piano Quartet No.1, op. 25 and No. 3, op. 60; Piano Quartet No. 2, op. 26
A Cocktail Party
Strauss: Don Quixote; Die Liebe der Danae

1991:
Prokofiev and Rachmaninoff: Cello Sonatas (with Emanuel Ax)
Tchaikovsky Gala in Leningrad
Brahms: Double Concerto; Berg: Chamber Concerto
Saint-Saëns: Cello Concerto No.1; Piano Concerto No.2; Violin Concerto No.3

1992:
Hush (with Bobby McFerrin)
Prokofiev: Sinfonia Concertante | Tchaikovsky: Variations
Brahms: String Sextets | Theme and Variations for Piano
Brahms: Sonatas for Cello and Piano (with Emanuel Ax)
Saint-Saëns: Organ Symphony; Bacchanale; Marche Militaire; Carnaval des animaux; Danse Macabre

1993:
Schoenberg: Verklarte Nacht | String Trio
Made in America
Yo-Yo Ma at Tanglewood (VHS)
Faure: Piano Quartets (with Emanuel Ax, Isaac Stern, and Jaime Laredo)

1994:
Immortal Beloved
Chopin: Chamber Music (with Emanuel Ax (tracks 1-9), Pamela Frank (tracks 1-4), and Ewa Osinska (track 10))
The New York Album
Greatest Hits: Gershwin
Greatest Hits: Tchaikovsky
Beethoven, Schumann: Piano Quartets (with Emanuel Ax, Isaac Stern, and Jaime Laredo)
Dvořák in Prague: A Celebration

1995:
Concertos from the New World
Greatest Hits: Saint-Saëns
Tackling the Monster: Marsalis on Practice (VHS)
Brahms, Beethoven, Mozart: Clarinet Trios (with Emanuel Ax and Richard Stoltzman)
The Essential Yo-Yo Ma

1996:
Premieres: Cello Concertos by Danielpour, Kirchner and Rouse
Schubert and Boccherini String Quintets
Lieberson: King Gesar | Corigliano:  Phantasmagoria (with Emanuel Ax (all tracks), tracks 1-7:  Omar Ebrahim, Peter Serkin, Andras Adorjan, Deborah Marshall, William Purvis,  David Taylor, Stefan Huge, and Peter Lieberson)
Appalachia Waltz
Schubert: Trout Quintet; Arpeggione Sonata (with Emanuel Ax, Pamela Frank (tracks 1-5), Rebecca Young (tracks 1-5), Edgar Meyer (tracks 1-5), and Barbara Bonney (track 9))

1997:
Soul of the Tango, music of Ástor Piazzolla
Liberty!
The Tango Lesson
Seven Years in Tibet
Symphony 1997
Mozart: The Piano Quartets (with Emanuel Ax, Isaac Stern, and Jaime Laredo)
From Ordinary Things
Goldschmidt: The Concertos

1998:
John Tavener: The Protecting Veil
Erich Wolfgang Korngold/ Schmidt: Music for Strings and Piano Left Hand
Inspired by Bach: "Falling Down Stairs" -- Cello Suite No.3
Inspired by Bach
Inspired by Bach: "Struggle For Hope" -- Cello Suite No.5
Inspired by Bach: "The Music Garden" -- Cello Suite No.1
Inspired by Bach: "Sarabande" -- Cello Suite No.4
Inspired by Bach: "The Sound of the Carceri" -- Cello Suite No.2
Inspired by Bach: "Six Gestures" -- Cello Suite No.6

1999:
John Williams Greatest Hits 1969–1999
My First 79 Years
Solo
Brahms: Piano Concerto No.2, Cello Sonata Op.78
Lulie the Iceberg
Songs and Dances
Franz Joseph Haydn
Simply Baroque (with Ton Koopman and the Amsterdam Baroque Orchestra)
Dvořák: Piano Quartet No.2 | Brahms:  Sonata for Piano and Cello in D major, op. 78 (with Emanuel Ax, Isaac Stern (tracks 1-4), and Jaime Laredo (tracks 1-4))

2000:
Inspired by Bach, Volume 2 (DVD)
Inspired by Bach, Volume 3 (DVD)
Tan Dun: Crouching Tiger, Hidden Dragon
Inspired by Bach, Volume 1 (DVD)
Corigliano: Phantasmagoria (The Fantasy Album)
Simply Baroque II (with Ton Koopman and the Amsterdam Baroque Orchestra)
Appalachian Journey Live in Concert (VHS and DVD)
Appalachian Journey (with Edgar Meyer and Mark O'Connor)
Dvořák: Piano Quartet No.2, Sonatina in G, Romantic Pieces

2001:
Classic Yo-Yo
Classical Hits
Heartland: An Appalachian Anthology

2002:
Naqoyqatsi: Original Motion Picture Soundtrack composed by Philip Glass
Yo-Yo Ma Plays the Music of John Williams
Silk Road Ensemble: Silk Road Journeys: When Strangers Meet
Meyer and Bottesini Concertos (with Edgar Meyer (tracks 1-3): Concerto for Cello and Double Bass)

2003:
Paris - La Belle Époque
Master and Commander: Original Motion Picture Soundtrack
Obrigado Brazil

2004:
The Dvořák Album
Vivaldi's Cello
Obrigado Brazil Live
Silk Road Ensemble: Silk Road Journeys: Beyond the Horizon

2005:
Yo-Yo Ma Plays Ennio Morricone, arranged and conducted by Ennio Morricone
Memoirs of a Geisha (soundtrack) (with Itzhak Perlman) (composed and conducted by John Williams)
The Essential Yo-Yo Ma
2006:

 Strauss: Cello Sonata in F Major, Op. 6, TrV 115 - Britten: Cello Sonata in C Major, Op. 65

2007:
Appassionato
Dvořák in Prague: a Celebration (DVD)

2008:
Silk Road Ensemble: New Impossibilities
Songs of Joy & Peace
The Bach Cello Suites
Songs of Joy & Peace

2009:
"Cinema Paradiso" on Chris Botti in Boston
 30 Years Outside the Box—Box set includes two bonus disks with various previously unreleased recordings

2010:
Mendelssohn:  Piano Trios and Songs without Words | Beethoven Ghost Piano Trio (with Emanuel Ax, Itzhak Perlman (tracks 1-8), Pamela Frank (track 14))

2011:
The Goat Rodeo Sessions (with Stuart Duncan, Edgar Meyer, and Chris Thile)
2012:

 Bach: Unaccompanied Cello Suites
 Concertos for the New World
 Appalachian Journey
 Vivaldi's Cello
 Yo-Yo Ma Plays Ennio Morricone
 Saint-Saëns, Lalo: Cello Concertos

2013:

 Yo-Yo Ma Plays Cello Masterworks

2014:

 Obrigado Brazil

2015:
Before this World (with James Taylor)
Songs from the Arc of Life (with Kathryn Stott)
Strauss: Don Quixote, Op. 35 & Schoenberg: Concerto in D Major for Cello and Orchestra 
Dvorák: Cello Concerto; Silent Woods; Rondo
Dvorák In Prague: A Celebration 
Seven Years in Tibet
Simply Baroque II
Yo-Yo Ma Plays The Music of John Williams
Schubert: Trout Quintet; Arpeggione Sonata; Die Forelle
Schubert, Boccherini: String Quintets
Solo
Paris - La Belle Époque
Saint-Saens: Carnival of the Animals
Crouching Tiger, Hidden Dragon - Original Motion Picture Soundtrack
Yo-Yo Ma - The Classical Cello Collection

2016:
Yo-Yo Ma & Silk Road Ensemble: Sing Me Home 
Schumann: Cello Concerto; Adagio & Allegro; Fantasiestücke
2017:

 Yo-Yo Ma Plays Bach
 Brigitte Klassik zum Genießen: Yo-Yo Ma

2018

 Six Evolutions - Bach: Cello Suites
 Yo-Yo Ma Plays Bach & Boccherini
 Six Evolutions - Bach: Cello Suites
 Salonen Cello Concerto
2019:

 Emanuel Ax & Yo-Yo Ma - A Celebration

2020
 Beethoven: Triple Concerto & Symphony No. 7 (with Anne-Sophie Mutter and Daniel Barenboim)
 Not Our First Goat Rodeo (with Stuart Duncan, Edgar Meyer, and Chris Thile)
 Songs of Comfort and Hope
2021:

 Hope Amid Tears - Beethoven: Cello Sonatas

References

External links
 Official site

Ma
 
Ma
Ma
Ma